Dehdari (also Romanized as Dehdārī) is a village in Cheghapur Rural District, Kaki District, Dashti County, Bushehr Province, Iran. At the 2006 census, its population was 127, in 29 families.

References 

Populated places in Dashti County